The Visitor is a stage musical with music and lyrics by Tom Kitt and Brian Yorkey and a book by Yorkey and Kwame Kwei-Armah, based on the 2007 film. It premiered at The Public Theater in October 2021.

Production history 
The musical was expected to have its world premiere at The Public Theater in New York City on October 7, 2021, for a limited run until November 21, 2021. Previews ultimately began on October 16.

Cast and characters

References

External links 

 Official website

Musicals based on films
2021 musicals
Off-Broadway musicals
Musicals by Brian Yorkey
Musicals by Tom Kitt (musician)
Plays set in the 21st century
Plays set in New York City